The Birmingham Civil Rights National Monument is a United States National Monument in Birmingham, Alabama established in 2017 to preserve and commemorate the work of the 1963 Birmingham campaign, its Children's Crusade, and other Civil Rights Movement events and actions. The monument is administered by the National Park Service.

History
President Barack Obama signed a proclamation on January 12, 2017, which designated half of the Birmingham Civil Rights District as a U.S. National Monument. Other proclamations signed the same day established the Freedom Riders National Monument in Anniston and the Reconstruction Era National Monument in Beaufort County, South Carolina.

Scope
Birmingham was the site of the 1963 Birmingham campaign, Martin Luther King's Letter from Birmingham Jail, the Children's Crusade with its images of students being attacked by water hoses and dogs, the bombing of the A.G. Gaston Motel – the movement's headquarters motel now designated as part of the National Monument – and the 16th Street Baptist Church bombing.

Most of the national monument resides within the larger  Birmingham Civil Rights District, which was designated in 1992 by the City of Birmingham. Historic sites within the monument include the A.G. Gaston Motel, 16th Street Baptist Church, Kelly Ingram Park, and St. Paul United Methodist Church. The National Monument also includes the historic building of Bethel Baptist Church in Birmingham's Collegeville neighborhood.

See also
 Birmingham Civil Rights Institute
 Birmingham Civil Rights District
 Kelly Ingram Park
 Freedom Riders National Monument
 Medgar and Myrlie Evers Home National Monument
 Civil rights movement in popular culture
 National Register of Historic Places listings in Birmingham, Alabama
16th Street Baptist Church
 List of national monuments of the United States

References

External links
Official National Park Service site

 

Historic district contributing properties in Alabama
National Monuments in Alabama
National Monuments designated by Barack Obama
Monuments and memorials of the civil rights movement
Protected areas established in 2017
2017 establishments in Alabama
Protected areas of Jefferson County, Alabama
Buildings and structures in Birmingham, Alabama